Aytaç Arman (born Veysel İnce; 22 June 1949 – 26 February 2019) was a Turkish actor. He appeared in more than 40 films and television shows between 1971 and 2019. He starred in the 1979 film The Enemy, which won an Honourable Mention at the 30th Berlin International Film Festival.

Selected filmography
 The Enemy (1979)
 Fatmagül'ün suçu ne? (1986) 
 Gece Yolculuğu (1987)
 Hunting Time (1988)
 The Trace (1994)
 Akrebin Yolculuğu (1997)
 Whatever You Wish (2005)
 After the Revolution (2011)

References

External links

1949 births
2019 deaths
Turkish male film actors
Golden Orange Life Achievement Award winners
Best Actor Golden Orange Award winners
Best Supporting Actor Golden Orange Award winners
People from Adana
Deaths from cancer in Turkey